Matthew King (by 1520 – 1566 or later), of Malmesbury, Wiltshire, was an English politician.

He was a Member (MP) of the Parliament of England for Malmesbury in October 1553, April 1554, 1555 and 1558.

References

Year of death missing
English MPs 1553 (Mary I)
English MPs 1554
English MPs 1555
English MPs 1558
Members of the Parliament of England for Malmesbury
Year of birth uncertain